Yevgeniya Kuzmina (born 9 August 1986) is a ski-orienteering competitor from Kazakhstan. She won four medals at the 2011 Asian Winter Games, including a gold medal in the relay, silver medals in the middle distance and the long distance, and a bronze medal in the sprint.

References

1986 births
Living people
Kazakhstani orienteers
Female orienteers
Ski-orienteers
Asian Games medalists in ski orienteering
Ski-orienteers at the 2011 Asian Winter Games
Asian Games gold medalists for Kazakhstan
Asian Games silver medalists for Kazakhstan
Asian Games bronze medalists for Kazakhstan

Medalists at the 2011 Asian Winter Games